KFKU was the radio station of the University of Kansas, broadcasting from Lawrence, Kansas. It operated primarily at 1250 kHz AM, though it was on other frequencies prior to 1940, and shared time with another station, WREN, which broadcast from Lawrence and then from Topeka (now Kansas City-based KYYS).

KFKU, in its later years on the air for as little as 30 minutes per day, broadcast its final programs in 1987; its closure occurred as a result of its time-share partner going off the air and had been preceded by the university focusing on its FM station, KANU, which began broadcasting in 1952. KFKU relied on WREN's broadcasting equipment to transmit for almost all of its history, effectively making it a phantom radio station. WREN returned to the air in 1991, but KFKU did not, and its license was later canceled by the Federal Communications Commission.

History
KFKU came to air December 15, 1924, and aired on 1090 kHz. Its first program was a concert by the KU band and a speech by Chancellor Ernest Lindley; the station had been set up thanks to a $20,000 grant from the engineering faculty for a tower and transmitter. In 1927, it was paired with newly licensed WREN, which had been set up to promote Jenny Wren flour, for the first time; both stations moved to 1180 on June 1. The pairing had been suggested when R. C. Jackman, the founder of WREN, was first assigned to share with WJAQ, now WIBW, in Topeka instead of with the other station in town. It was licensed for 500 watts, but broadcast at 1,000 using WREN's transmission equipment, located in the storage room of the Bowersock Mills and Power Company. Radio reallocations moved KFKU/WREN to 1220 kHz in 1928 and 1250 kHz in 1940. By 1935, KFKU and WREN were broadcasting during the day with 5,000 watts. A nighttime power increase followed in 1948, with adequate protections to 1250 kHz in Milwaukee.

Initial programming on KFKU ran on Monday and Thursday nights and included lectures complementing correspondence courses in areas such as philosophy and Spanish, as well as special events such as commencement and basketball games.

By the late 1940s, the KFKU-WREN time sharing agreement was described as "not a happy one"; KFKU broadcast for just an hour daily. A defunct FM station in Hutchinson donated its equipment to the university, and in 1952, the sign-on of KANU created a new and primary outlet for KU's radio programming output. Ultimately, KFKU's broadcasts were diminished to an hour, and later thirty minutes, with WREN operating at all other times, and after 1959, KFKU's programs were merely simulcasts of KANU. WREN was unwilling to give the university more airtime, having noticed that KFKU's programs portended ratings drops for WREN.

Shared-time operation ended after more than 60 years when financial difficulties claimed WREN on September 2, 1987. The university indicated at the time that it intended to return to the air alongside WREN, though there was little internal interest for taking over the facility on a full-time basis. On December 9, 1991, WREN returned to the air alone on 1250 kHz. In 1996, owing to the length of silence and the university's failure to respond to FCC letters, potentially thinking it had already surrendered the station, KFKU's license was designated for hearing and ultimately canceled.

In 2006, one of the last physical vestiges of KFKU, the tower behind Marvin Hall used for early transmissions and later to transmit student-run KJHK, was damaged by a wind storm that bent some of the tower's supports and damaged the feed line to KJHK. KJHK's antenna was relocated, and the university dismantled the tower as a result of the damage sustained.

References

External links
FCC History Cards for KFKU
FCC History Cards for KYYS (former WREN)

1924 establishments in Kansas
Defunct radio stations in the United States
University of Kansas
1987 disestablishments in Kansas
Radio stations established in 1924
Radio stations disestablished in 1987
FKU
FKU